Gugark, formerly known as Meghrut, is a major village in the Lori Province of Armenia, named for the province of Gugark in Greater Armenia. It borders with Vanadzor, being 2 km south-east, and is situated along the Debed River. The village is 1,325 meters above sea level. It was renamed from Meghrut to Gugark on May 25, 1983.

Gugark was the centre of the Gugark District of Armenia SSR during the USSR, which became the site of an anti-Azerbaijani pogrom in 1988.

Demographics 
Rural residents of the village have immigrated to Gugark from villages in the Nagorno-Karabakh and Tavush regions.

Economy 
Gugark occupies an area of 2158 hectares, of which 195 ha is used as arable land, 240 hectares of meadows, 700 hectares of pasture and 20 hectares of fruit gardens.

The population produces wheat, barley, potatoes, cabbage, melons and gourds. Livestock owners produce milk, meat, wool, eggs, and honey.

Historical Sites 
The town is home to St. Sarkis Church, built in the 19th century.

NGOs 
In 2013, the village had one kindergartens which is attended by 35 children, and two high schools, with 842 students.

Gugark also has a House of Culture, with a sports school and a music school. There is a library, which has 23 books.

Gallery

See also 
 Gugark pogrom

References

World Gazeteer: Armenia – World-Gazetteer.com

Populated places in Lori Province